Pyruvate dehydrogenase phosphatase catalytic subunit 1 (PDPC 1), also known as protein phosphatase 2C, is an enzyme that in humans is encoded by the PDP1 gene. PDPC 1 is an enzyme which serves to reverse the effects of pyruvate dehydrogenase kinase upon pyruvate dehydrogenase, activating pyruvate dehydrogenase.

Function 

Pyruvate dehydrogenase (E1) is one of the three components (E1, E2, and E3) of the large pyruvate dehydrogenase complex. Pyruvate dehydrogenase kinases catalyze phosphorylation of serine residues of E1 to inactivate the E1 component and inhibit the complex. Pyruvate dehydrogenase phosphatases catalyze the dephosphorylation and activation of the E1 component to reverse the effects of pyruvate dehydrogenase kinases.

Pyruvate dehydrogenase phosphatase is a heterodimer consisting of catalytic and regulatory subunits. Two catalytic subunits have been reported; one is predominantly expressed in skeletal muscle, and another one is much more abundant in the liver. The catalytic subunit, encoded by this gene, is the former, and belongs to the protein phosphatase 2C (PP2C) superfamily. Along with the pyruvate dehydrogenase complex and pyruvate dehydrogenase kinases, this enzyme is located in the mitochondrial matrix.

Regulation 

Pyruvate dehydrogenase phosphatase is stimulated by insulin, PEP, and AMP, but competitively inhibited by ATP, NADH, and Acetyl-CoA.

Clinical significance 

Mutation in the PDP1 gene causes pyruvate dehydrogenase phosphatase deficiency.

References

Further reading

External links